The 2001 Merdeka Tournament is the 37th editions of the Merdeka Tournament and was held on 21 to 30 June 2001.

Groups

Group stage

Group A

Group B

Knockout stage

Semi finals

Finals

Award

External links
 2001 Merdeka Tournament at RSSF.com website

2001
2001 in Malaysian football
Merd
2001 in Uzbekistani football
2000–01 in Bahraini football
2000–01 in Slovak football
2000–01 in Indian football
2001 in Thai football
Mer